Three Nights is a 1920 German silent film directed by Carl Boese and starring Otto Gebühr, Grete Hollmann, and Sybill Morel.

The film's sets were designed by the art director Fritz Kraenke.

Cast
Otto Gebühr as American
Grete Hollmann as Kokette
Sybill Morel as sick woman
Reinhold Schünzel as criminal
Leo Selma

References

External links

Films of the Weimar Republic
Films directed by Carl Boese
German silent feature films
German black-and-white films